Azzolini is an Italian surname. Notable people with the surname include:

Giovanni Bernardino Azzolini (c. 1572 – 1645), Italian painter and sculptor
Sergio Azzolini (born 1967), Italian classical bassoonist and conductor
Tito Azzolini (1837–1907), Italian architect

See also
Azzolino

Italian-language surnames